Shabaran (also spelled Shaburan and Shaberan), was a town and district in the historical region of Shirvan, in what is now the eastern part of Azerbaijan.

Shabaran was founded by the Sasanian king Shapur II. The 10th-century Persian geography Hudud al-'Alam refers to it as Shav.ran, whilst The Georgian Chronicles calls it Shaburan, which points to a possible relation to Shavur (Shapur?), an Iranian name that is attested in the Caucasus. Shabaran was the earliest capital of the Shirvan kingdom. 

It was often contested between the Shirvanshahs, the Hashimids of Darband, and the rulers of Arran. According to the 10th-century Arab geographer al-Maqdisi, the majority of Shabaran's population was Christian. In 983, the Shirvanshah Muhammad IV had a wall constructed around Shabaran. The sudden emergence of Iranian names among the descendants of Shirvanshah Yazid ibn Ahmad is significant in relation to the fact that he and his daughter Shamkuya were buried in Shabaran. This development most likely resulted from Yazid ibn Ahmad's union with a princess of an ancient local dynasty. 

In 1538 Shirvanshah rule was abolished by the Safavid shahs (kings) of Iran, who turned Shirvan into a province, which Shabaran was part of. The German explorer Engelbert Kaempfer (died 1716) mentions Shabaran as one of the villages in Iran that had coffeehouses.

Shabaran was completely destroyed in 1723.

References

Sources
 
 
 
 
 
 
 
 

Former populated places in Azerbaijan
Sasanian cities
Shapur II

de:Şabran